Uğur Aktaş (born October 10, 1995) is a European champion Turkish karateka competing in the kumite 84 kg division. He won one of the bronze medals in the men's +75 kg event at the 2020 Summer Olympics held in Tokyo, Japan. He is a member of İstanbul Büyükşehir Belediyesi S.K.

He won one of the bronze medals in the men's 84 kg event at the 2022 Mediterranean Games held in Oran, Algeria.

Aktaş graduated from Istanbul Aydın University with a degree in Electrical/Electronic engineering.

Achievements
2015
  1st European Games – 13 June, Baku, AZE – kumite 67 kg,

2017
  European Championships – 6 May, İzmit, TUR – kumite 67 kg,

2020
  2020 Olympic Games

References

External links 
 

1995 births
Living people
Turkish male karateka
Istanbul Büyükşehir Belediyespor athletes
Karateka at the 2015 European Games
European Games medalists in karate
European Games bronze medalists for Turkey
European champions for Turkey
Competitors at the 2018 Mediterranean Games
Karateka at the 2019 European Games
European Games silver medalists for Turkey
Competitors at the 2017 World Games
World Games medalists in karate
Karateka at the 2020 Summer Olympics
Olympic karateka of Turkey
Medalists at the 2020 Summer Olympics
Olympic medalists in karate
Olympic bronze medalists for Turkey
Istanbul Aydın University alumni
Competitors at the 2022 Mediterranean Games
Mediterranean Games bronze medalists for Turkey
Mediterranean Games medalists in karate
20th-century Turkish people
21st-century Turkish people